The Tunisian grading system is mostly an over 20point grading scale: it is used in secondary schools and universities. For primary schools, a new system has been introduced, based on a letter-grade scale; the old system uses a 10-point grading scale for the first term and a 20-point scale for the second and third terms.

Currently, most Tunisian universities use a traditional 20-point grading scale, but after the introduction of the new National Higher Education Reform, a new grading scale, similar to that of the ECTS grading scale, is becoming more and more common.

Most of the time, the formal grades used in Tunisia are not considered in graduate programs acceptance. A grade of 12 (which is actually a passable grade in Tunisia but equivalent to 60% in the US where it is considered a below average) is generally a good starting grade to apply for graduate studies and financial aids or scholarships. This is due to a severe testing and evaluation system employed in most Tunisian universities. Generally, at the national level, a grade of 12 or above is considered a good grade. This is why some European universities use a different admission requirement for Tunisian students. Tunisia's neighboring countries, Algeria & Morocco, have a very similar grading system.

Grading is Tunisia is done on a scale of 0-20. to convert it to letter or % grades refer to the table below :

References
2.https://www.jmu.edu/admissions/apply/country-reqs/africa-and-middle-east/tunisia.shtml#pagecontent

Tunisia
Grading
Grading